La tigre è ancora viva: Sandokan alla riscossa! (transl. The tiger is still alive: Sandokan to the rescue!) is a 1977 Italian adventure film directed by Sergio Sollima and starring Kabir Bedi. It follows on from the 1976 television series Sandokan, itself inspired by the series of novels by Emilio Salgari featuring the pirate hero Sandokan.

Plot
Sultan Abdullah conquers the island of Mompracem, the haunt of Sandokan's pirates. The sultan is a puppet of the British army, very happy to have sent into exile Sandokan. Lord James Brooke, the new governor of the British soldiers, discovers where Sandokan is: the pirate is trying a new assault together Mompracem with the Indian princess Jamilah; and so man calls himself the powerful thugs, the killers of the Ganges, the bloodthirsty goddess worshiped Kali. Sandokan soon realizes that his fight for the reconquest of the island of Mompracem is not easy. In fact James Brooke calls the thugs, and all the wild populations of India, who are hungry and thirsty for booty.

Cast
 Kabir Bedi as Sandokan
 Philippe Leroy as Yanez de Gomera
 Adolfo Celi as James Brooke
 Sal Borgese as Kammamuri
 Massimo Foschi as Teotokris
 Néstor Garay (as Nestor Garai)
 Mirella D'Angelo as Surama
 Teresa Ann Savoy as Jamilah
 Franco Fantasia as Colonel

References

External links

1977 films
1970s historical adventure films
Italian historical adventure films
1970s Italian-language films
Films based on the Indo-Malaysian cycle
Films directed by Sergio Sollima
Films set in Malaysia
Films set in the 19th century
1970s Italian films